The Golden Bell Award for Best Directing for a Miniseries or Television Film is one of the categories of the competition for Taiwanese television production, Golden Bell Awards. It has been awarded since 2001.

Winners

2020s

References

Directing for a Miniseries or Television Film, Best
Golden Bell Awards, Best Directing for a Miniseries or Television Film